A gowni is a long, flowing, colourful, frilly garment worn by Zanzibari women.

References 

Tanzanian culture
African clothing